Marcos, officially the Municipality of Marcos,  is a 4th class municipality in the province of Ilocos Norte, Philippines. According to the 2020 census, it has a population of 18,010.

Formerly a part of Dingras, Ilocos Norte, Marcos was created on June 22, 1963, by Republic Act No. 3753, named in honor of Mariano Marcos, the father of former President Ferdinand Marcos.

History

Political violence 
The small town of Marcos has seen multiple violent political attacks.

On the morning of June 3, 2017, Mayor Arsenio Agustin was shot in the head and died on the spot after inspecting a project in Barangay Mabuti. Municipal employee Mark Valencia was also shot in the back. The mayor's bodyguards fired back at the gunman but the gunman got away.

Just after dark on the evening of April 4, 2017, Vice Mayor Jessie Ermitanio survived an ambush and shootout while driving on an unpopulated section of road between the Padsan River and the Daquioag Elementary school. The vice mayor's driver Lucky Jesrel Rumbaoa died from the gunshots and his security escort Ricky Florendo and Municipal Council staffer Edralin Arellano were injured.

Mayor Agustin had been receiving death threats prior to the shooting and the vice mayor had requested a police escort after he believed he was being stalked when serving as acting mayor in October 2016.

On February 4, 2013, the former mayor Salvador Pillos survived an attack by motorcycle-riding gunmen, who shot him while he was inspecting a project.

On the afternoon of February 23, 2013, the Barangay Fortuna chairman Alfredo Arce was gunned down by a gunman riding tandem on the back of a motorcycle. Arce was shot in the chest and died on the spot.

Geography

Barangays
Marcos is politically subdivided into 13 barangays. These barangays are headed by elected officials: Barangay Captain, Barangay Council, whose members are called Barangay Councilors. All are elected every three years.

Four barangays were named after Mariano Marcos' four children: 
 Ferdinand Marcos (1917-1989), who became president of the Philippines (1965–1986)
 Pacifico Marcos (1919-), a physician
 Elizabeth Marcos-Keon (1921-1986), former Ilocos Norte governor (1971-1983) and mother of Michael Marcos Keon
 Fortuna Marcos-Barba (1931-2018)

Climate

Demographics

Economy

Government
Marcos, belonging to the second congressional district of the province of Ilocos Norte, is governed by a mayor designated as its local chief executive and by a municipal council as its legislative body in accordance with the Local Government Code. The mayor, vice mayor, and the councilors are elected directly by the people through an election which is being held every three years.

Elected officials

References

External links
 [ Philippine Standard Geographic Code]
Philippine Census Information
Local Governance Performance Management System

Municipalities of Ilocos Norte